The 1936 Furman Purple Hurricane football team was an American football team that represented Furman University as a member of the Southern Conference (SoCon) during the 1936 college football season . In their fifth year under head coach Dizzy McLeod, the team compiled an overall record of 7–2 with a mark of 4–1 in conference play, finishing in third place in the SoCon. Furman defeated Davidson, 14–13, on October 31, in the first game played at Sirrine Stadium.

Schedule

References

Furman
Furman Paladins football seasons
Furman Purple Hurricane football